"The One with the Proposal" is a double length episode of the television situation comedy Friends. It first aired on May 18, 2000, as the finale to the sixth season. It is normally transmitted as a whole episode in a one-hour slot, but when it is split for a half-hour slot the episodes are differentiated by having the title suffixed with Part One and Part Two. The episode was selected for Volume 4 of the "Best of Friends" DVD series, and when the series left the air in 2004, several articles and viewer polls included this episode as one of the 10 best of the series' 236 episodes.

Plot

Part One
Ross is being questioned by his friends about his relationship with Elizabeth, mainly asking if the relationship is going anywhere. Ross quickly claims he and Elizabeth are great together, and his friends are all wrong, until he sees her having a water balloon fight with her buddies. Deciding she is too young, he breaks off the relationship. Afterward, Ross questions his decision, until Elizabeth confirms her immaturity by dropping water balloons on his head from her upstairs window.

Rachel takes Phoebe and Joey to a charity event helping children, including a silent auction. While Phoebe is obviously over-drinking, Joey has bigger problems; misunderstanding the silent auction process, Joey thought that bidders guessed an object's worth, with the prize going to the person with the closest guess. Joey "guesses" $20,000 and wins a yacht. Rachel and Joey try to convince the next highest bidder to buy the boat, but in the process of persuading the man of the boat's virtues, Joey changes his mind and wants it for himself, although he can barely afford it.

After weeks of preparation, Chandler is ready to propose to Monica. While at a restaurant, Chandler begins his proposal however before he can ask the question Monica's ex-boyfriend Richard walks in and the moment is lost. When the others come home from the charity event, they constantly ask to see Monica's hand, thinking Chandler proposed already. Feeling that Monica will figure out that Chandler plans to propose, Joey suggests that Chandler pretend he does not care about marriage and may never want to get married. Meanwhile, Richard approaches Monica at work and declares his love for her.

Part Two
Richard tells Monica that he has never gotten over her and that he wants to marry and have children with her. Monica is left confused and when Chandler talks about how he hates marriage and cannot see why anyone should get married she starts to feel unsure about their whole relationship. After Joey tells Monica that Chandler seemingly has no interest in getting married, Monica tells him that Richard wants to marry her, leading Joey to tell her that Chandler does love marriage, making Monica even more confused. She decides enough is enough and goes to meet Richard at his apartment. After talking to him about the unfairness of the situation, she soon leaves to think things over.

Feeling envious of Chandler and Monica, Rachel decides to follow Phoebe's lead and secure Ross as her marriage "backup": they will get married if they are both still single at 40. However, she finds that Phoebe had long since made Ross her second backup after Joey. All three confront Phoebe about this, and it is decided that Joey will remain Phoebe's backup, while Ross becomes Rachel's.

Joey tells Chandler how his plan has backfired on him and he is now in serious danger of losing Monica for good, and he leaves on a frantic search intending to propose when he finds her. Chandler comes to Richard's apartment and asks for Monica, only to find that she has left. He tells Richard off for blowing his own chances years ago, and also says that he and Monica are meant to be together, revealing he had intended to propose. Richard advises Chandler to go to Monica, telling him if he succeeds in winning her back, he must never let her go.

After searching for Monica all day, Chandler hurries back to his apartment and when he gets there, Joey meets him in the hall, claiming Monica has left because of his commitment issues, despite Joey trying to convince her otherwise. When Chandler enters their apartment, believing he has destroyed his relationship with Monica, he discovers that it is far from being abandoned, there are candles lit all over and Monica is kneeling to propose. In the midst of proposing to Chandler, she cries from sheer emotion and is unable to continue. Instead, Chandler gets on his knees and proposes to her and Monica accepts. They then open the door to Joey, Rachel, and Phoebe, who have been waiting to celebrate. At first, they hesitate, feeling Ross should be there to share the moment, then decide that after three marriages, Ross can afford to miss one engagement celebration. The end credits play while Monica and Chandler slow dance to Eric Clapton's "Wonderful Tonight".

Production

According to the producers' DVD commentary for this episode, the original plot for Ross was to have Elizabeth announce that she was pregnant, ultimately resolving at the end of the following season when it would be revealed that Ross was not the father of the baby. This idea was ultimately rejected by the producers since it would be investing a lot of time in a secondary character without a payoff. It would have also have been difficult to use the cliffhanger for Rachel's pregnancy.

Sources suggest that David Schwimmer was actually out of the country filming Band of Brothers when the final scenes of the episode were filmed, hence why Ross is not there when the friends hug Monica and Chandler on hearing their announcement.

The producers decided to end the episode on a romantic moment rather than the usual joke. They also took care over the script before approaching Selleck to return as Richard, as the actor would only return if it seemed feasible.

The episode very nearly served as the series finale, given that NBC and Warner Bros. were in negotiations over the show's future up until four days before the episode aired. The series' stars demanded $750,000 salary for each actor per episode and agreed to a contract for two additional seasons, an agreement that later stretched into a further two seasons at $1 million salary for each of the stars.

Reception
Entertainment Weekly listed Chandler and Monica's  proposal scene in their "26 Great 'I Love You's".

Awards and nominations
 Primetime Emmy Award for Outstanding Multi-Camera Picture Editing for a Series (nominated)

References

External links
 
 

2000 American television episodes
Friends (season 6) episodes